Gaedea is a genus of moths belonging to the family Zygaenidae.

Species
Species:
 Gaedea separata Hering, 1925

References

Zygaenidae
Zygaenidae genera